Fred Kaiss is an American football coach who is currently the offensive coordinator for the DC Defenders of the XFL. He has previously served as offensive coordinator at Morgan State University, Alabama A&M University, Hampton University, Tennessee State University, Alabama State University, and Alcorn State University.

Coaching career

Early career 
Kaiss began coaching at Brooklyn High School and Andover High School, both in Maryland. In 1990, Kaiss was hired as the head coach of Southwestern High School in Baltimore. There he lead a previously winless team to two straight winning seasons before leaving in 1992.

College career 
In 1992, he was hired as the offensive coordinator, quarterback coach, and receivers coach at Morgan State University. In 1993, Keiss moved on to Southern University, where he served as runningbacks coach, recruiting coordinator, and special teams coordinator. There he won the Black College National Championship and SWAC Championship in 1993 and 1995. From 1997 to 1999, he served as special teams coordinator/wide receivers coach at Tennessee State University. In 2000, he became the offensive coordinator/receivers coach at Alabama A&M University.

In 2001, he became the offensive coordinator and quarterbacks coach at Hampton University. He spent five seasons as offensive coordinator there, winning back-to-back black national championships.

In 2006, he returned to Tennessee, where he served as offensive coordinator. He also served as a regional recruiting coordinator.

In 2010, he was hired to be the offensive coordinator at Alabama State University. There he served under Head Coach Reggie Barlow. In 2014, the Hornets moved on from both Barlow and Kaiss.

From 2014 to 2017, he served as the offensive coordinator at Alcorn State University.

DC Defenders 
In 2022, Kaiss was announced as the offensive coordinator of the DC Defenders of the XFL. There he was reunited with former head coach Reggie Barlow, who he worked with at Alabama State University.

References 

DC Defenders
DC Defenders coaches
XFL (2020)
Year of birth missing (living people)
Living people